Robert Delandre (6 October 1879, Elbeuf - 2 June 1961, Paris) was a French sculptor. He was a student of Alexandre Falguière and Denys Puech.

Works
 Le Vent et la feuille (The Wind and the Leaf, exhibited at the Salon des artistes français of 1912)
 Monuments to the dead of Fère-Champenoise, Oissel, Saint-Étienne-du-Rouvray, Cutry...
 Monument To those lost in Latham 47 at Caudebec-en-Caux (1931)
 Monument of Neuf-Marché
 Meditation, Fitzroy Gardens, Melbourne (Australia)
 Bust of Alexis Ballot-Beaupré, Cour de cassation, Palais de justice, Paris

1879 births
1961 deaths
People from Elbeuf
20th-century French sculptors
20th-century French male artists
French male sculptors